John Asen Zaccaria or Asanes Zaccaria (died 1469) was the bastard son of the last Prince of Achaea, Centurione II Zaccaria (reigned 1404–1430). From 1446 on, he was kept imprisoned in the Chlemoutsi castle by the Byzantine Despot of the Morea, Thomas Palaiologos. In 1453, however, he managed to escape, and taking advantage of a widespread revolt against the Despots, seized the castle of Aetos, claiming his father's title. In 1454, however, faced with the combined forces of Despot Thomas and his Turkish allies under Turahan Bey, he abandoned the fortress and fled to the Venetian stronghold of Modon.

From there he went to Italy; he is reported as being in Genoa in 1459, and from 1464 until his death in 1469 he resided in Rome.

References 

1469 deaths
15th-century people from the Principality of Achaea
John
Year of birth unknown
Prisoners and detainees of the Byzantine Empire
John